This is a comprehensive list of songs released, recorded, performed or written by Plan B.

Released songs

Original songs

Collaborations

Featuring Plan B

Written by Plan B

Cover versions

Unreleased songs

Original songs

Cover versions

See also
 Plan B discography

References

External links
 
 
 
 

Lists of songs recorded by British artists